Cotopaxia is a genus of flowering plant in the family Apiaceae, comprising two species.

Species
Cotopaxia asplundii Mathias & Constance
Cotopaxia whitei Constance & W.S.Alverson

References

Taxa named by Lincoln Constance
Taxa named by Mildred Esther Mathias
Taxonomy articles created by Polbot
Apioideae
Apioideae genera